Gastropsetta frontalis, the shrimp flounder, is a species of large-tooth flounder, the only member of its genus Gastropsetta. It is endemic to the western Atlantic Ocean, from North Carolina to Florida, and from the northern Gulf of Mexico to Panama. It also occurs in The Bahamas.

It occurs in bays and shallow waters.

References

Fish of the Atlantic Ocean
Paralichthyidae
Fish described in 1895
Taxa named by Barton Appler Bean
Monotypic fish genera
Monotypic marine fish genera
Monotypic ray-finned fish genera